Erin Okonek (born ) is an American female weightlifter, competing in the 69 kg category and representing United States at international competitions. She competed at world championships, most recently at the 2005 World Weightlifting Championships.

Major results

References

Further reading
 Heads-Lane Misses Lifts, Still Makes Olympic Team
 European Championships 2003 Report
 CHAMPIONS 2000; From Sydney To the Bronx, the Winners
 Weightlifting - Erin OKONEK

1978 births
Living people
American female weightlifters
Place of birth missing (living people)
21st-century American women
20th-century American women